Tan Songyun (born 31 May 1990), also known as Seven, is a Chinese actress, singer and model. She is best known for her roles in television series The Whirlwind Girl (2015), With You (2016),  The Fox's Summer (2017), Under The Power (2019), Go Ahead (2020), and The Sword and the Brocade (2021). On October 17, 2019, she was selected into the 2019 Forbes China 30 Under 30 Elite List.

Career
Tan started her career as a child actress in 2005, when she filmed the television series Wild Chrysanthemum. She gained more attention in 2012, after starring in the hit historical drama Empresses in the Palace. She then starred in youth dramas The Whirlwind Girl and With You. Both dramas gave her more recognition and popularity. She won the Most Promising Actress award at the iQiyi All-Star Carnival for her role in With You and the Best New Actress award at the Huading Awards for My Whirlwind Girl.

In 2017, she starred in hit romantic comedy drama The Fox's Summer, which won her the Best Actress award for the network section at the Asia New Media Film Award as well as the Golden Bone Flower Awards. The same year she starred in the youth sports romance drama My Mr. Mermaid.

In 2019, Tan starred in the historical mystery drama  Under The Power.  Forbes China listed Tan under their 30 Under 30 Asia 2019 list which consisted of 30 influential people under 30 years old who have had a substantial effect in their fields.

In 2020, Tan starred in the period action drama The Eight produced by Chen Kaige; slice-of-life family drama Go Ahead, and period drama Dear Mayang Street.

In 2021, she starred in the historical romance drama The Sword and the Brocade.

In 2021, Tan terminated her endorsement contract with the clothing manufacturer Nike after the company put out a statement that they will not use cotton produced in the Xinjiang region of China for human rights violations against Uyghurs.

Filmography

Film

Television series

Variety show

Discography

Awards and nominations

References

Chinese film actresses
Chinese television actresses
21st-century Chinese actresses
1990 births
Living people
Actresses from Sichuan
People from Luzhou
Beijing Film Academy alumni
Chinese women television presenters
Chinese television presenters
Chinese broadcasters
VJs (media personalities)